María Rocío Ríos Pérez (born 13 March 1969, León, Spain) is a retired female long-distance runner from Spain, who represented her native country at the 1996 Summer Olympics in the women's marathon race, finishing in fifth place.

A resident of Gijón, Ríos set her personal best (2:28:20) in the classic distance on 15 October 1995 in San Sebastián. She is a four-time national champion in the 10,000 metres (1992, 1993, 1996, and 1997), and a three-time national champion in the half marathon (1992, 1994, and 1995).

Achievements

References

sports-reference
atletismoasturiano

1969 births
Living people
Spanish female long-distance runners
Olympic athletes of Spain
Athletes (track and field) at the 1996 Summer Olympics
Sportspeople from Gijón
Competitors at the 1987 Summer Universiade